Akiba Commercial Bank (ACB) is a commercial bank in Tanzania. It is licensed by the Bank of Tanzania, the central bank and national banking regulator.

Overview
The bank is a retail commercial bank that focuses on serving the poorest of poor Tanzanians and their enterprises. It operates as a microfinance bank. , its total asset base was valued at TSh 169.4 billion (approximately US$72.64 million), with shareholders' equity of TSh 21.4 billion (approximately US$9.18 million). In 2013, Akiba Commercial Bank was ranked "the best customer-focused bank in Tanzania" based on convenience, customer care and pricing.

The headquarters of Akiba Commercial Bank are located at Amani Place, along Ohio Street, in the central business district of the city of Dar es Salaam, the financial capital and largest city in Tanzania. The geographical coordinates of the bank's headquarters are: 06°48'42.0"S, 39°17'16.0"E (Latitude:-6.811667; Longitude:39.287778).

, Akiba Commercial Bank operated a network of branches, in Dar es Salaam, Arusha, Dodoma, Mwanza and other urban centers in the country.

The Board of Directors of the bank comprises eight individuals. The Chairman is one of the seven non-Executive Directors. The Managing Director and Chief Executive Officer (CEO), is answerable to the Board.

History
Akiba Commercial Bank was established in 1997 by Tanzanian business people with the objective of serving the banking needs of the poorest of Tanzanians, who were hitherto unbanked and not served by the large commercial banks. It opened its doors that year, after receiving a commercial banking license from the Bank of Tanzania. The majority of Akiba's shares are owned by individual Tanzanians. Akiba maintains a management agreement with Accion, primarily covering the areas of product design, marketing and training.

Ownership
The stock of Akiba Commercial Bank is privately owned by individuals and corporate entities including the following, as of 31 December 2016.

{| style="font-size:95%;"
|-
| width="80%" align="center" | Akiba Commercial Bank Stock Ownership
|- valign="top" 
|

See also

References

External links
 Website of Bank of Tanzania
 Website of Akiba Commercial Bank

Banks of Tanzania
Companies of Tanzania
Economy of Dar es Salaam
Banks established in 1997
1997 establishments in Tanzania